"Shadows in the Moonlight" is a song written by Charlie Black and Rory Bourke, and recorded by Canadian country pop music singer Anne Murray.  It was released in May 1979 as the second single from the album New Kind of Feeling.  The song reached No. 1 on the Billboard Hot Country Singles chart that July, and was one of three chart-toppers for her during the year. "Shadows in the Moonlight" was Murray's third No. 1 single on the country chart and fourth overall (counting "You Needed Me," which topped the Billboard Hot 100 in 1978).

"Shadows in the Moonlight" was released during Murray's peak as a crossover artist, and the song was one of several that also charted on the Hot 100. The song peaked at #25 in July and spent three weeks at #1 on the Billboard Hot Adult Contemporary Tracks chart.

Charts

Weekly charts

Year-end charts

Sources
[ New Kind of Feeling by Anne Murray] at Allmusic

1979 singles
Songs written by Rory Bourke
Songs written by Charlie Black
1979 songs
Anne Murray songs
Song recordings produced by Jim Ed Norman
Capitol Records singles